Fredericton Transit (or the City of Fredericton Transit Division) is a small transit operator in Canada owned by the city of Fredericton, New Brunswick. It also includes Dial-A-Bus service for people with disabilities.

Services

Fredericton Transit provides public transport to most residential districts Monday to Saturday between 6:15 am and 11:00 pm. Kings Place in the central business district is the common interchange point for all services. A typical route has an hourly frequency throughout the day, with more frequent services in peak hour.

Fredericton Transit routes are often suffixed with N or S, denoting the direction in which the bus travels. As of April 22, 2022 Fredericton Transit operates the following routes:

Fleet

Current

Fredericton Transit currently has 28 buses on 12 routes operating Monday to Saturday.

 NovaBus LFS 
 denotes wheelchair access

Retired
 General Motors Diesel Division Buses T6H-4523N
 General Motors Diesel Division Buses T6H-5307N
 General Motors Diesel Division Buses TC40-102N (Classic)
 Motor Coach Industries TC40-102N  (Classic)
 Novabus TC40-102N (Classic)

See also

 Public transport in Canada

References

External links
 Overall Transit Map

Fredericton Transit
Transport in Fredericton
Bus transport in New Brunswick